The First Lady Brendon is a 1931 novel by the British writer Robert Hichens. A woman tries to escape from her disastrous first marriage. Much of the novel takes place in Egypt, a popular setting in the author's novels.

References

Bibliography
 Vinson, James. Twentieth-Century Romance and Gothic Writers. Macmillan, 1982.

1931 British novels
Novels by Robert Hichens
Novels set in Egypt